Xinqiao is a town under the administration of Xiangcheng City in southeastern Henan province, China, located less than  north with the border with Anhui and  south of downtown Xiangcheng. , it has 29 villages under its administration.

See also 
 List of township-level divisions of Henan

References 

Township-level divisions of Henan
Xiangcheng City